Grigori Dmitriyevich Grishin (born 10 September 1997) is a Russian football player.

Club career
He made his debut in the Russian Professional Football League for FC Torpedo Vladimir on 28 July 2015 in a game against FC Khimki.

References

External links
 
 Profile by Russian Professional Football League

1997 births
People from Vladimir, Russia
Living people
Russian footballers
University of Pretoria F.C. players
Jomo Cosmos F.C. players
FC Tyumen players
Russian expatriate footballers
Expatriate soccer players in South Africa
Association football defenders
National First Division players
FC Torpedo Vladimir players
Sportspeople from Vladimir Oblast